Aratinga vorohuensis is a prehistoric relative of the nanday parakeet described from Late Pliocene fossils found in and named after the Vorohué Formation of Buenos Aires Province, Argentina.

References 

Aratinga
Pliocene birds of South America
Uquian
Neogene Argentina
Fossils of Argentina
Fossil taxa described in 1996